is a Japanese football player currently playing for Renofa Yamaguchi FC.

Career statistics
Updated to 19 July 2022.

Notes

References

External links
Profile at Omiya Ardija
Profile at Kawasaki Frontale

1985 births
Living people
Komazawa University alumni
Association football people from Saitama Prefecture
Japanese footballers
J1 League players
J2 League players
Kawasaki Frontale players
Omiya Ardija players
Renofa Yamaguchi FC players
Association football defenders